Balazucellus hubeicola is a species of beetle in the family Carabidae, the only species in the genus Balazucellus.

References

Trechinae